Aitana Sánchez-Gijón de Angelis (born 5 November 1968) is a Spanish and Italian film actress.

Early life 
Aitana Sánchez-Gijón was born in Rome on 5 November 1968, to a Spanish father , a history lecturer exiled from Francoism, and an Italian mother, Fiorella de Angelis, a lecturer. She was named after Aitana Alberti, Rafael Alberti's daughter. The latter dedicated Aitana Sánchez-Gijón some verses upon her birth. The family moved to Madrid when she was 1 year old.

Career
Sánchez-Gijón made her television debut as an actress at age 16 in the high school series Segunda enseñanza, playing Sisi, a lesbian teenager.

Her breakthrough role as Elena in the 1989 film Bajarse al moro launched her career.

Best known for her career in Spanish cinema, Sánchez-Gijón first became known internationally for her portrayal of Victoria Aragon, a pregnant and abandoned Mexican-American winegrower's daughter who is helped by travelling salesman Paul Sutton (Keanu Reeves) in A Walk in the Clouds (1995)

She has since built a reputation as an international star in films such as Manuel Gomez Pereira's Boca a Boca (1996), Bigas Luna's The Chambermaid on the Titanic (1997), Jaime Chávarri's Sus Ojos Se Cerraron (1998), Gabriele Salvatores' adaptation of the Niccolò Ammaniti novel I'm Not Scared (2003) and Brad Anderson's The Machinist (2004).

She served as the president of the Academy of Cinematographic Arts and Sciences of Spain between 1998 and 2000.

Filmography 

Film

Television

Accolades

References
Informational notes

Citations

External links
 

1968 births
Living people
20th-century Spanish actresses
Spanish film actresses
Italian emigrants to Spain
Actresses from Rome
21st-century Spanish actresses
Spanish stage actresses
Spanish television actresses